The 2002 Hawaii Warriors football team represented the University of Hawaii at Manoa as a member of the Western Athletic Conference (WAC) during the 2002 NCAA Division I-A football season. Led by fourth-year head coach June Jones, the Warriors compiling an overall record of 10–4, finished second in the WAC with a mark of 7–1. They were invited to the Hawaii Bowl, where they lost to Tulane.

Schedule

Team players in the NFL

References

Hawaii
Hawaii Rainbow Warriors football seasons
Hawaii Warriors football